The 1955 Georgia Bulldogs football team represented the Georgia Bulldogs of the University of Georgia during the 1955 college football season.

Schedule

Source: GeorgiaDogs.com: 1955 football schedule

References

Georgia
Georgia Bulldogs football seasons
Georgia Bulldogs football